Singing Drums is an album by percussionist Pierre Favre recorded in 1984 and released on the ECM label. Modern Drummer called the pieces on the album "a bunch of hypnotic, surprisingly melodic pieces for four rhythmatists."

Reception
The Allmusic review by Michael G. Nastos awarded the album 4½ stars stating "For special tastes".

Track listing
All compositions by Pierre Favre except as indicated
 "Rain Forest" - 5:14   
 "Carneval of the Four" - 6:11   
 "Metal Birds" - 5:22   
 "Edge of the Wing" - 4:17   
 "Prism" - 8:14   
 "Frog Songs" - 6:07   
 "Beyond the Blue" - 5:48  
Recorded in Mohren, Willisau on March 26 & 27, 1984

Personnel
Pierre Favre - drums, gongs, crotales, cymbals
Paul Motian - drums, gongs, crotales, calebasses, rodbrushes
Fredy Studer - drums, gongs, cymbals
Nana Vasconcelos - berimbau, voice, tympani, conga, water pot, shakers, bells

References

ECM Records albums
Pierre Favre (musician) albums
1984 albums
Albums produced by Manfred Eicher